Ohlertidion ohlerti is a species of comb-footed spider in the family Theridiidae. It is found in North America, Europe, and Russian Asia.

References

Theridiidae
Spiders described in 1870
Holarctic spiders